= Great Little Box Company =

The Great Little Box Company (GLBC) is a Canadian company that manufactures custom and stock corrugated boxes, point-of-purchase displays, digital print and packaging, labels and flexible packaging, folding cartons, and protective packaging. The company also distributes shipping and moving supplies. GLBC's main manufacturing facility is located in Richmond, British Columbia and occupies over 500,000 square feet (46,000 m^{2}). In addition GLBC has a second manufacturing facility in Edmonton, AB and distribution locations in Kelowna and Victoria, British Columbia, Everett, Washington. The Great Little Box Company has won a number of awards. Most recently, they have been honored as one of BC's Top Employers, Canada's Platinum Best Managed companies, and Canada's Most Admired Corporate Cultures.

== Timeline ==
The company was founded in 1982, and began with three employees and some second-hand machinery.

As the company grew, it began selling moving supplies in 2004 and in 2006 a label and plastics division was added.

In 2007, the company acquired Boxstar Industries. By 2008 it employed 170 people and by 2012 it had about 250 employees.

In 2014, the Great Little Box Company merged with the Great West Paper Box Company; it was then the largest box-maker in Western Canada.

In 2015, the company operated from four locations in British Columbia and Washington state and employed about 270 people.

In 2020 Great Little Box Company acquired Ideon Packaging. That same year, the Everett location expanded to a 28,000 sqft facility on Riverside Road.

In 2021 Great Little Box Company opened a warehouse in Abbotsford and expanded to include a location at Eburne Way in Richmond.

In 2023 Great Little Box Company added the addition of a print plate division.

In 2024 Great Little Box Company achieved G7 Master qualification.

In 2025 Great Little Box Company began manufacturing operations in Edmonton, AB and now employs over 500 employees.

The company has won several product awards that highlight their expertise in print, packaging design, and manufacturing. Most recently they won Innovation of the Year at the Paperboard Packaging Competition for Tacofino Burrito x Jarrito carrier.
